This List of Fritillaria species shows the accepted species names within the genus Fritillaria, of which there are about 100 to 130.

Alphabetical list of species 

Formerly included
Numerous names have been coined using the name Fritillaria but referring to species now considered better suited to other genera  (Calochortus Disporum Erythronium Eucomis Lilium Notholirion). We provide links to help you find appropriate information.

Subgenera 

The species of Fritillaria are divided amongst eight subgenera. A partial list of species by subgenera is shown here:

Fritillaria

Rhinopetalum Fisch.
5 species

Theresia Koch 
Monotypic
 F. persica L.

Petilium (L.) Endl. 
4 species

Liliorhiza (Kellog) Benth. & Hook.f.

Korolkowia Rix  
Monotypic
 F. sewerzowii Regel

Davidii Rix 
Monotypic
  F. davidii Franchet

Japonica Rix 
8 species

Notes

References

Bibliography 

 
 
 
 
 
 
 

 List
Fritillaria